Étang de Bois Rouge is a lake in the city of St.André, Réunion, France. At an elevation of 1 m, its surface area is 0.05 km².

Lakes of Réunion